Constantine of Baberon (died c. 1263) was a powerful Armenian noble of the Het‛umid family. He was the son of Vassag and the father of King Het‛um I, who ruled the Armenian Kingdom of Cilicia from 1226 to 1270.  Constantine played a pivotal role in placing his son on the throne by engineering the murder of Philip, the husband of Isabella, Queen of Armenia.  He tricked Philip's father, Bohemond IV of Antioch, to search for his son at Amouda rather than at Sis, where he was being tortured and poisoned.  He then took his army to the gates of Silifke Castle, forced its Frankish lords to surrender Isabella, and arranged the marriage, making his son the first Het‛umid ruler of the Armenian Kingdom.

Constantine began construction on the elaborate baronial apartments at Baberon (Çandır Castle), which were still standing in 1979.  Nearby, at a site known today as Kız Kilisesi near Gösne, he built a monastic retreat with an ornate chapel whose dedicatory inscription is dated to 1241.

The Castle of Tamrut, about 75 km northeast of Baberon, also had an Armenian dedicatory inscription (now destroyed) over its main gate which mentioned having been built in memory of “the father of the King… Baron Constantine.”  It also gave the medieval Armenian name of the castle as Tambrout, a name otherwise unattested in the surviving histories, and the year of construction as 1253.

Constantine, also known as the Grand Baron Constantine, was married to Stephanie of Barbaron, with whom he had Stephanie of Lampron. In 1205, he married Alix Pahlavouni (a third-cousin of Leo II), with whom he fathered:
 Sempad the Constable 1208–1276
 Hethum I of Armenia 1213–1270
 Ochine of Korykos, father of the historian Hayton of Corycus
 John (Basil), the Bishop of Sis
 Lewon (Leon)
 Maria, who married John of Ibelin, Count of Jaffa and Ascalon, the famous jurist
 Stephanie of Lampron, married in 1237 to King Henry I of Cyprus
 Hripsimeh (Daisy)

In his third marriage, Constantin married Biatr around 1220, who gave birth to:
 Yovhanes, Bishop of Mavleon, then Archbishop of Sis
 Vacahk, lord of Gantschi
 Licos
 a daughter married to Simon Mansel, Constable of Antioch
 Kostandin, Lord of Neghir and Perzerpert (Partzerpert), ancestor of Kings Constantine III and Constantine VI.

Notes

References
"Le Royaume Armenien de Cilicie", Claude Mutafian, Editions CNRS, Paris, p. 80
 

1263 deaths
Year of birth unknown
Kings of the Armenian Kingdom of Cilicia